I Got Love may refer to:
 I Got Love (album), a 1970 album by Melba Moore
 "I Got Love" (Taeyeon song)
 "I Got Love" (Nate Dogg song)